The Familiar, Volume 2: Into the Forest is an American novel by writer Mark Z. Danielewski. Released on Oct 27, 2015, it is the second of a planned 27-volume story entitled The Familiar as well as the second book of Season 1, which includes The Familiar Volumes 1-5. The book serves as a continuation of nine characters' interlocking stories introduced in the first book.

Reception
Writing for NPR, Jason Sheehan described Into the Forest as "better" and "cleaner" than its predecessor: "More consistent in its chaos — its flurry of parentheticals, its screwball layout with words scattered and made into shapes, its glossy insertions of counter-textual material (pictures and illustrations, un-mated parentheses used as raindrops spattering the page)."

References

External links 
 The Familiar forum on markzdanielewski.com

2015 American novels
Postmodern novels
Novels by Mark Z. Danielewski
Novels set in Los Angeles
Pantheon Books books